Mark Hamilton (born February 6, 1958) is an American sprint canoer who competed in the early to mid-1990s. Competing in two Summer Olympics, he earned his best finish of ninth in the K-4 1000 m event at Barcelona in 1992.

References
Sports-Reference.com profile

1961 births
American male canoeists
Canoeists at the 1992 Summer Olympics
Canoeists at the 1996 Summer Olympics
Living people
Olympic canoeists of the United States